My Father, Myself is a 2022 Philippine drama film directed by Joel Lamangan starring Dimples Romana, Sean de Guzman and Jake Cuenca.

Premise
The film revolves around Robert (Jake Cuenca) and his wife (Dimples Romana). The couple have a daughter (Tiffany Grey) and an adopted son, Matthew (Sean de Guzman) whose biological father is Robert's deceased best friend and former lover, Domeng (Allan Paule). Conflict ensues as Robert becomes sexually attracted to a teenage Matthew while Matthew impregnates his stepsister much to the shame of the family matriarch.

Cast
Dimples Romana as Robert's wife
Sean de Guzman as Matthew, Robert's adopted son
Jake Cuenca as Robert, a human rights lawyer who is a closeted gay man who married a woman
Allan Paule as Domeng, a peasant leader who was Robert's former friend and lover
Tiffany Grey as Mica,Matthew's stepsister

Production
Described as a "boy's love" (BL) film, My Father, Myself was produced under Mentorque Entertainment and 3:16 Media Network. It has Joel Lamangan as its director and Quinn Carrillo as its writer. Lamangan is also the director of two LGBT-related films Rainbow's Sunset and Isa Pang Bahaghari. Principal photography began on July 2022.

On concerns raised that the film might have a negative impact on the LGBT+ community following the release of the trailer, Lamangan address this by saying that he based the film on a real story that happened in his province adding that not all gay stories should be positive or else that would be "unrealistic" or "romanticism". He had to change the ending since the story he based the film on was "tragic". Nevertheless, he insist he tackled he sensitive theme in a pleasant way and believed that there is a good lesson audience could derive from the film. There is no sexual act or frontal nudity were depicted in the film although there is a kissing scene between Cuenca and de Guzman's characters.

Release
My Father, Myself premiered in cinemas in the Philippines on December 25, 2022 as one of the official eight entries of the 2022 Metro Manila Film Festival. It was given a R-18 rating by the Movie and Television Review and Classification Board. Director Lamangan sought for the film to be rated R-16 but was unsuccessful. Lamangan said that the R-18 rating was due to the film's incestuous themes and it being a serious LGBT film rather than a comedic LGBT film.

References

Philippine LGBT-related films
Philippine drama films
Philippine romance films
LGBT-related romantic drama films
Incest in film
Gay-related films
2022 LGBT-related films